Twelve men's teams competed in basketball at the 1996 Summer Olympics.

Group A

Angola

The following players represented Angola:

 Edmar Victoriano
 Aníbal Moreira
 Ângelo Victoriano
 Benjamim Ucuahamba
 Honorato Trosso
 Víctor de Carvalho
 Herlander Coimbra
 Justino Victoriano
 David Dias
 Benjamim João Romano
 José Carlos Guimarães

Argentina

The following players represented Argentina:

 Marcelo Nicola
 Daniel Farabello
 Luis Villar
 Esteban De la Fuente
 Ernesto Michel
 Marcelo Milanesio
 Juan Espil
 Diego Osella
 Fabricio Oberto
 Jorge Racca
 Esteban Pérez
 Rubén Wolkowyski

China

The following players represented China:

 Mengke Bateer
 Gong Xiaobin
 Hu Weidong
 Li Nan
 Li Xiaoyong
 Liu Yudong
 Shan Tao
 Sun Jun
 Wang Zhizhi
 Wu Naiqun
 Wu Qinglong
 Zheng Wu

Croatia

The following players represented Croatia:

 Arijan Komazec
 Damir Mulaomerović
 Davor Marcelić
 Dino Rađa
 Josip Vranković
 Slaven Rimac
 Stojko Vranković
 Toni Kukoč
 Velimir Perasović
 Veljko Mršić
 Vladan Alanović
 Žan Tabak

Lithuania

The following players represented Lithuania:

 Artūras Karnišovas
 Arvydas Sabonis
 Darius Lukminas
 Eurelijus Žukauskas
 Gintaras Einikis
 Mindaugas Žukauskas
 Rimas Kurtinaitis
 Rytis Vaišvila
 Šarūnas Marčiulionis
 Saulius Štombergas
 Tomas Pačėsas

United States

The following players represented the United States:

 Penny Hardaway
 Charles Barkley
 David Robinson
 Gary Payton
 Grant Hill
 Hakeem Olajuwon
 John Stockton
 Karl Malone
 Mitch Richmond
 Reggie Miller
 Scottie Pippen
 Shaquille O'Neal

Group B

Australia

The following players represented Australia:

 Andrew Gaze
 Andrew Vlahov
 Brett Maher
 John Dorge
 Mark Bradtke
 Pat Reidy
 Ray Borner
 Sam Mackinnon
 Scott Fisher
 Shane Heal
 Tonny Jensen
 Tony Ronaldson

Brazil

The following players represented Brazil:

 Ratto
 Tonico
 Josuel
 Caio
 Caio da Silveira
 Olívia
 Ferraciú
 Pipoka
 Janjão
 Oscar Schmidt
 Rogério
 Wilson Minucci

Greece

The following players represented Greece:

 Kostas Patavoukas
 Pap Papanikolaou
 Dinos Angelidis-Khronis
 Efthimis Bakatsias
 Efthimios Rentzias
 Lefteris Kakiousis
 Frankie Alvertis
 Giorgos Sigalas
 Nikos Oikonomou
 Panagiotis Fasoulas
 Panagiotis Giannakis
 Fanis Christodoulou

Puerto Rico

The following players represented Puerto Rico:

 José Rafael Ortíz
 Joël Curbelo
 Pablo Alicea
 Richard Soto
 Jerome Mincy
 Eddie Rivera
 Carmelo Travieso
 Juan Ramón Rivas
 Edgar Padilla
 Eugenio Soto
 Daniel Santiago
 Georgie Torres

South Korea

The following players represented South Korea:

 Lee Sang-min
 Gang Dong-hui
 Yang Hui-seung
 Hyeon Ju-yeop
 Heo Jae
 Mun Gyeong-eun
 O Seong-sik
 Jo Dong-gi
 Jeon Hui-cheol
 Jeong Jae-geun
 Jeong Gyeong-ho

FR Yugoslavia

The following players represented FR Yugoslavia:

 Saša Đorđević
 Dejan Bodiroga
 Dejan Tomašević
 Milenko Topić
 Miroslav Berić
 Nikola Lončar
 Predrag Danilović
 Saša Obradović
 Vlade Divac
 Žarko Paspalj
 Željko Rebrača
 Zoran Savić

References

1996
Basketball at the 1996 Summer Olympics – Men's tournament